Wide Awake is the debut album of English pop singer Joe McElderry, winner of the sixth series of British talent competition The X Factor. The album was released digitally on 22 October 2010, with a physical release following on 25 October 2010.

Two retailer exclusive versions of the album were available, with Asda offering four bonus cards and play.com offering signed copies of the album.

Background
McElderry recorded his first single "The Climb" in December 2009, releasing it on 14 December, shortly after he won the sixth series of the British television talent contest The X Factor. The singer received 61.3% of the final public vote. Joe's prize was a £1 million recording contract with Syco Music, a subsidiary of Sony BMG including a £150,000 advance payment. After completing X Factor Live tour, various meetings of the album took place and recording on the album began in July, before being completed in early September. Joe worked with producers Ray Hedges, Dallas Austin and John Shanks on the album.
Simon Cowell contacted Journey for permission to release a cover of "Don't Stop Believin'", which McElderry had covered on the show before, as a single, but was declined. The album was originally planned to include a selection pop-rock, ballad and slow songs, however, the album's direction was changed upon completion of the single "Ambitions".

Ahead of the album's release Digital Spy reported that it would outsell previous male winners of the X-Factor based on pre-order charts where Wide Awake was 49% higher sales than 2005's winner Shayne Ward's debut album, 23.2% higher than 2007's winner Leon Jackson's Right Now and 40.7% higher than Steve Brookstein's Heart and Soul. McElderry had said before its release that the album had "some different elements" and is "definitely going to be a bit of a shocker", while Simon Cowell said that McElderry "has moved on to new musical territory" and that fans would be "pleasantly surprised". McElderry launched the album at G-A-Y. "Until the Stars Run Out" contains elements of "Faith" by George Michael.

Singles
"The Climb", a cover of Miley Cyrus' single, was released on 14 December 2009, as the X Factor winner's single. It reached number-one on the UK Singles Chart, Scottish Singles Chart and Irish Singles Chart. It also peaked at number four on the European Hot 100 Singles chart, and appears as a bonus track on the album, for the UK and Ireland editions only.

"Ambitions", a cover of Donkeyboy's single, was released as the lead single from Wide Awake, and second overall single. The track made its debut on The 5:19 Show on 19 September 2010. McElderry performed the single on the seventh series of The X Factor on 10 October 2010, the same day that the single was released by digital download, causing the iTunes Store to crash for two minutes as fans tried to download the track. The physical CD single was released following day, reaching number 4 on the Irish Singles Chart and number 6 on the UK Singles Chart. "If You Love Me" is the B-Side.

"Someone Wake Me Up" is the third single from the album. It was released on 5 December 2010. The video contains clips from the film The Chronicles of Narnia: The Voyage of the Dawn Treader but the song will not appear in the film, however, the B-Side "There’s A Place For Us" is played during the credits of the film. The single peaked at number 68 in the UK and number 69 in Ireland.

Commercial performance
Wide Awake debuted at number 3 on the UK Albums Chart in its first week of release, with retail sales of 39,405 copies in the country during that week. The album fell to number 20 on the chart the following week, and to number 40 the week after that. As of November 2015, the album has sold 105,231 copies in the United Kingdom.

Critical reception 

Wide Awake received generally positive reviews from critics. Acclaim came from Heat which called Wide Awake "The best album ever released by a winner of The X Factor" and gave it 5 stars. Unreality Shout praised the album and said it is "the best X Factor winner's album to date, despite it being nearly schizophrenic of nature: one minute you're flouncing you're way through some of the campest songs of the year ('Real Late Starter', 'Fahrenheit'), throwing some suggestive moves and jazz hands while you do so, and the next you're relaxing in the shade of a veranda in the back garden of a country farm house, looking out on fields upon fields of lush greenery ('Smile', 'Wide Awake')." Gay Times gave the songs on the album a positive review. BBC Music said the album is "a disco-dusted debut of giddy pop pleasures." Yahoo! Music gave the album 7/10. 4Music gave the album 4 stars, saying "rather than making the ballad-heavy collection that everyone was expecting, Joe has produced a fun, upbeat pop album which takes its inspiration from acts such as Alphabeat ('Feel the Fire') and Scissor Sisters ('Fahrenheit')" OK! also gave the album 4 stars, saying "recent single 'Ambitions' sets the tone, with its chugging guitars, while 'Someone Wake Me Up' is an epic lighters-aloft stunner and 'Real Late Starter' has a definite Take That vibe."

Track listing

Charts

References

2010 debut albums
Joe McElderry albums
Syco Music albums
Albums produced by Ash Howes
Albums produced by Richard Stannard (songwriter)